Bicorp is a municipality in the comarca of Canal de Navarrés in the Valencian Community, Spain.

See also
 Cuevas de la Araña en Bicorp

References

Municipalities in the Province of Valencia
Canal de Navarrés